Lamentations 3 is the third chapter of the Book of Lamentations in the Hebrew Bible or the Old Testament of the Christian Bible, part of the Ketuvim ("Writings"). This book contains the elegies of the prophet Jeremiah. In this chapter he refers to his own experience under affliction as an example as to how the people of Judah should behave under theirs, so as to have hope of a restoration.

Text 
The original text was written in Hebrew language. This chapter, the longest in the book, is divided into 66 verses.

The chapter is acrostic, divided into 22 stanzas. The stanzas consist of three lines (each line is numbered as one verse), each of which begins with the same Hebrew letter of the Hebrew alphabet in regular order (22 letters of alphabet in number, make up the total of 66 verses).

Textual versions
Some early witnesses for the text of this chapter in Hebrew are of the Masoretic Text, which includes Codex Leningradensis (1008). Fragments containing parts of this chapter were found among the Dead Sea Scrolls, i.e., 3Q3 (3QLam; 30 BCE‑50 CE) with extant verses  53-62

There is also a translation into Koine Greek known as the Septuagint, made in the last few centuries BCE. Extant ancient manuscripts of the Septuagint version include Codex Vaticanus (B; B; 4th century), Codex Alexandrinus (A; A; 5th century) and Codex Marchalianus (Q; Q; 6th century).

Verse 1
 I am the man who has seen affliction by the rod of His wrath.
 "Who has seen affliction": - i. e. has experienced, suffered it. Jeremiah's own affliction in the dungeon of Malchiah (Jeremiah 38:6); that of his countrymen also in the siege.
 "By the rod of His wrath": showing that it is not Babylon who has humbled Israel as Jehovah's instrument, but that God himself has brought these troubles upon his people. "He had led me, has hedged me about," etc. The king of Babylon, called "the rod of the Lord's anger". The Targum states, "by the rod of him that chastiseth in his anger."

Verse 22

King James Version:
 It is of the Lord's mercies that we are not consumed,
 because his compassions fail not.

English Standard Version:
 The steadfast love of the Lord never ceases;
 his mercies never come to an end;

Verse 22 in Hebrew
Masoretic text:
 חסדי יהוה כי לא־תמנו
 כי לא־כלו רחמיו׃
Transliteration:
    -
  - .

 "It is of the Lord's mercies that we are not consumed" literally, "The Lord's mercies that we are not consumed" (Hebrew: חסדי יהוה כי לא־תמנו    -). The word "we" is unclear, especially considering that in verse 23 (which is clearly parallel) the subject of the sentence is "the Lord's mercies," not "we," so probably the reading of the Targum and the Peshitta (as adopted by Thenius, Ewald, and Bickell) is correct, "The Lord's mercies, verily they cease not" (tammu for tamnu).

An example of a change from singular to plural, compare also .

Verse 23
 They are new every morning:
 great is thy faithfulness.
Cross reference: ;

Verse 23 in Hebrew
חדשים לבקרים רבה אמונתך׃
Transliteration
  la-,  .

Verse 24
 "The Lord is my portion," says my soul,
 "Therefore I hope in Him!"
Having God for "our portion" is the "one only foundation of hope".

Verses 46–51
In , two initial letters, "Ayin" and "Pe", are transposed. This is found is three instances in the whole book (Lamentations 2:16–17; 3:46-51; 4:16–17). Grotius thinks the reason for the inversion of two of the Hebrew letters, is that the Chaldeans, like the Arabians, used a different order from the Hebrews; in the first Elegy (chapter), Jeremiah speaks as a Hebrew, in the following ones, as one subject to the Chaldeans, but Fausset thinks it is doubtful.

See also
 Jacob
 Judah
 Jerusalem
 Zion
Related Bible parts: Isaiah 10, Lamentations 2

Notes

References

Sources

External links

Jewish
Lamentations 3 Hebrew with Parallel English
Lamentations 3 Hebrew with Rashi's Commentary

Christian
Lamentations 3 English Translation with Parallel Latin Vulgate

03